Vladimir Nikolaevich Burkov is a Russian control theorist and the author of more than four hundred publications on control problems, game theory, and combinatorial optimization. Laureate of State Prize of USSR, of Prize of Cabinet Council of USSR, he is an Honoured Scholar of the Russian Federation. Vladimir Burkov is a vice-president of Russian Project Management Association (SOVNET) (the Russian branch of International Project Management Association, IPMA), Member of Russian Academy of Natural Sciences. A professor at Moscow Institute of Physics and Technology and Head of Laboratory at V.A. Trapeznikov Institute of Control Sciences of RAS, in the end of the 1960s he pioneered the theory of active systems (which was a Soviet version of the theory of mechanism design).

Biography 
Vladimir Burkov was born on November 17, 1939, in the city of Vologda. In 1963 he graduated from the Moscow Institute of Physics and Technology (MIPT) and was employed by Institute of Automation and Remote Control (since the 1970s it is known as ICS RAS, V.A. Trapeznikov Institute of Control Sciences of RAS), where he earned his Candidate of Sciences degree in 1966, and became Doctor of Sciences in 1975. In 1981 he earned professorship at the Chair of Control Sciences at MIPT and since 1974 he works at ICS RAS as a Head of Laboratory 57 "Laboratory of active systems" (until 2019) and a senior research scientist.

Married to Elena Burkova, the couple has a daughter Irina, who also earned the doctoral degree for her contributions to control theory.

Contributions to combinatory optimization and project scheduling 
Early academic interests of Vladimir Burkov were connected with applied problems of combinatorial optimization; in the 1960s he contributed to the boom of project scheduling and network planning, proposed novel models of resource allocation in organizations and in technical systems, solved several extremal graph problems. In particular, Vladimir Burkov proposed a lower-bound estimate of the project makespan in resource-constrained project scheduling problem re-invented in 1998 by A. Mingozzi et al. Two books by Vladimir Burkov, "Network models and control problems" and "Applied problems of graph theory"  put forward the problems being intensively studied until now.

Launching theory of active systems 
Since late 1960s interests of Vladimir Burkov shift to the studies of specific nature of human being as a controlled object (an agent). In 1969 he pursued an idea of the "fairplay principle" (in Russian: принцип открытого управления): plans assigned to selfish agents by the optimal control mechanism must be coordinated with agents' goal functions. Under such an incentive-compatible mechanism, truthtelling is beneficial for agents. The notion of incentive compatibility was independently proposed by Leonid Hurwitz, and later was extended and elaborated by Allan Gibbard, Roger Myerson, and many other researchers. They pioneered the revelation principle, which opened a new era in the studies of economic institutions (mechanism design and contract theory); it was mentioned as the main achievement in 2007s Nobel Memorial Prize in Economic Sciences won by L. Hurwitz, E. Maskin, and R. Myerson.

The fairplay principle became the foundation of the newly introduced theory of active systems (a version of mechanism design originated from USSR), which systematically studied control mechanisms in man-machine systems. In the 1970s the seminal books and articles determined the directions of theory development for many decades to come (some books of the early 2010s are ).

Organizational and teaching activities 
In 1973 V. Burkov headed the newly created division in the Institute of Automation and Remote Control called "the Sector of Business Games"; in 1974 it was re-organized into the Laboratory 57 "Theory and methods of business games" later renamed to "Laboratory of Active Systems". As of the end of 2016 its headcount is 28 employees including 15 Doctors of Sciences and 5 Candidates of Sciences. During the decades V. Burkov supervised dozens of thesis works.

Famous followers 
Professor Dmitry Novikov, corresponding member of Russian Academy of Sciences (since 2008), was elected a director of ICS RAS on October 17, 2016.

References 

1939 births
Living people
Russian mathematicians
Control theorists
Moscow Institute of Physics and Technology alumni
Soviet mathematicians